Sucker Punch is the second album released by the band Haji's Kitchen. It was released in 2001. It is the band's first and only album with former vocalist Vince Mullins. There were three planned songs to make it on the album, which two of them were featured in Dragon Ball Z: Broly The legendary Super Saiyan

These songs being Day after Day, Lost, and Notch, They ended up being featured on Haji's third and final album Twenty Twelve.

Track listing 
 "As Ever Beyond" – 4:30
 "Son I Am" 3:51
 "Sucker Punch" – 4:20
 "Just Like Me" – 4:05
 "Syncopated" – 3:58
 "Return" – 3:49
 "Take" – 4:03
 "Medicated" – 4:15
 "Nothin'" – 3:30
 "Moon Song" – 3:32
 "Cracker" – 3:57
 "Face Down" – 4:03

References 

Haji's Kitchen albums
2001 albums